Asset health management or (AHM) is the field of study which looks at how to manage the "health" of an asset or assets.  This often includes methods to establish asset health and effort to decide the appropriate actions to be taken to manage the assets' health. This also includes the discussion of health at end of life to ensure the asset's full life is used efficiently.

Asset health management includes many different methods which can sometime overlap in their intended scope and methods.  Asset health management has become a difficult field to discuss due to the use of the same acronym to describe multiple different approaches and the use of the same approach with different names.  

Asset health management can be considered a subset of Asset management

Asset health management taxonomy
Asset health management consists of multiple strategies and parts but a rough description is given as follows.
 Asset health diagnostics
 Methods used to establish the current health of the asset
 Asset health prognostics
 Methods used to predict how the health of the asset will change in the future
 Asset health maintenance
 see :Category:Maintenance
 including maintenance, repair, and operations (better referred to as maintenance, repair, and overhaul). These methods are used to keep an asset health, restore health to an asset or through major work restore usable life to an asset.
 Asset end of life decisions
 Asset disposal

Management of multiple assets
There is often also a consideration of additional work done to manage the health of multiple assets within the same framework.
Sometimes referred to as Fleet health management and falling within the study of Fleet management. Although it is common to need to manage the health of multiple assets they are not always vehicles and frequently of mixed type.

When resources are constrained it is a fascinating management problem to consider how best to manage the health of assets.  It is rare that assets can be managed in an unconstrained way  as resources are always limited by a need to make efficient use of them.

Asset health management relevant standards
A collection of some standards which are often use to manage the health of assets.
This is not intended to be an exhaustive list and will organically improve.
 Open O&M
 MSG-3

Asset health management examples
A short list is provided to illustrate the many methods that are some sort of asset health management method or philosophy.
 IVHM
 Built-in_self-test
 Built-in_test_equipment
 HUMS

References

Industrial engineering

Asset management